Mogoșani is a commune in Dâmbovița County, Muntenia, Romania with a population of 4,510 people. It is composed of five villages: Chirca, Cojocaru, Merii, Mogoșani and Zăvoiu.

Natives
 Constantin Bușoiu

References

Communes in Dâmbovița County
Localities in Muntenia